Campbell High School is a school in Campbell, an inner suburb of Canberra, Australia, for students in years 7-10 in the Australian Capital Territory's education system.

The school is located at the foot of Mount Ainslie adjacent to the former CSIRO's headquarters and the Australian War Memorial, with the front of the building running along Treloar Crescent, and the school oval facing  Limestone Avenue.

History

The school was opened in 1965 and was named for Scottish settler Robert Campbell who settled in the area in the early 1820s. The school maintains links to the Clan Campbell.

On 17 November 2011 President of the United States Barack Obama and Australian Prime Minister Julia Gillard spoke to eighteen students at the school during Obama's visit to Australia.

References

External links
Campbell High School

Educational institutions established in 1965
High schools in the Australian Capital Territory
1965 establishments in Australia